Ernest  Brooks Wilkins Jr. (July 20, 1922 – June 5, 1999) was an American jazz saxophonist, conductor and arranger who spent several years with  Count Basie. He also wrote for Tommy Dorsey, Harry James, and Dizzy Gillespie. He was musical director for albums by Cannonball Adderley, Dinah Washington, Oscar Peterson, and Buddy Rich.

Early career
Wilkins was born in St. Louis, Missouri.  In his early career he played in a military band, before joining Earl Hines's last big band. He worked with Count Basie from 1951 to 1955, eventually leaving to work free-lance as a jazz arranger and songwriter. His success declined in the 1960s, but revived after work with Clark Terry, leading to a tour of Europe.

Final years in Denmark
Eventually Wilkins settled in Copenhagen, Denmark, where he would live for the rest of his life. There he formed the Almost Big Band so he could write for a band of his own formation. The idea was partly inspired by his wife Jenny. Copenhagen had a thriving jazz scene with several promising jazz musicians as well as a well-established community of expatriate American jazz musicians which had formed in the 1950s and now included representatives like Kenny Drew and Ed Thigpen who joined the band along with Danish saxophonist Jesper Thilo. The band released four albums, but after 1991 he became too ill to do much with it.

Wilkins was responsible for orchestral arrangements on 1972's self-titled album by Alice Clark, on Mainstream Records.

Ernie Wilkins died in Copenhagen on June 5, 1999 of a stroke.

He has a street named after him in southern Copenhagen, "Ernie Wilkins Vej" (Ernie Wilkins Street).

Awards and honors
 1981 Ben Webster Prize

Discography
 Kenny Clarke & Ernie Wilkins (Savoy, 1955) with Kenny Clarke
 Flutes & Reeds  (Savoy, 1955)
 Top Brass (Savoy, 1955)
 Trumpet Album (Savoy, 1955)
 The Drum Suite (RCA Victor, 1956) with Manny Albam
 Day In, Day Out (1960)
 The Big New Band of the '60s (Fresh Sound, 1960)
 Here Comes the Swingin' Mr. Wilkins (Everest, 1960)
 Ernie Wilkins & the Almost Big Band (Storyville, 1980)
 Almost Big Band Live (Matrix Music Marketing, 1981)
 Live! At the Slukefter Jazz Club (Matrix Music Marketing, 1981)
 Montreux (SteepleChase, 1983)
 On the Roll (SteepleChase, 1986)
 Kaleidoduke (Polygram, 1995)
 Hard Mother Blues (P-Vine, 2007)
 Kinda Dukish (Gazell, 2012)

As sideman/arranger
With Count Basie
 Dance Session (Clef, 1953)
 Basie Jazz (Clef, 1954) – recorded in 1952
 The Count! (Clef, 1955) – recorded in 1952
 Dance Session Album#2 (Clef, 1954)
 Basie (Clef, 1954)

With Louis Bellson
 Let's Call It Swing (Verve, 1957)
 Drummer's Holiday (Verve, 1958)

With DR Big Band
 Suite for Jazz Band (Hep, 1992) – guest conductor, recorded in 1991

With Rob Franken
 Fender Rhodes (Sonic Scenery, 2009) – compilations recorded in 1973-76 & 2009

With Maynard Ferguson
 Maynard '63 (Roulette, 1962)

With Dizzy Gillespie
 Jazz Recital (Norgran, 1955)
 World Statesman (Norgran, 1956)
 Dizzy in Greece (Verve, 1957)

With Al Grey
 Struttin' and Shoutin' (Columbia, 1983) – recorded in 1975

With Joe Newman
 All I Wanna Do Is Swing (RCA Victor, 1955)
 Soft Swingin' Jazz (Coral, 1958)

As composer/arranger
With Ernestine Anderson
 My Kinda Swing (Mercury, 1960)
With Count Basie
 Count Basie Swings, Joe Williams Sings (Clef, 1955) with  Joe Williams
 April in Paris (Verve, 1956)
 Metronome All-Stars 1956 (Clef, 1956) with Ella Fitzgerald and Joe Williams
 One O'Clock Jump (Verve, 1957) with Joe Williams and Ella Fitzgerald
 Me and You (Pablo, 1983)
With Ray Brown
 Ray Brown with the All-Star Big Band (Verve, 1962)
With Kenny Clarke
Telefunken Blues (Savoy, 1955)
With Jimmy Cleveland
 Cleveland Style (EmArcy, 1958)
 A Map of Jimmy Cleveland (Mercury, 1959)
With Al Cohn
 The Natural Seven (RCA Victor LPM 1116, 1955)
 That Old Feeling (RCA Victor LPM 1207, 1955)
With Eddie "Lockjaw" Davis
 Trane Whistle (Prestige, 1960)
With Maynard Ferguson
 Maynard '62 (Roulette, 1962)
With Dizzy Gillespie
 Birks' Works (Verve, 1957)
With Freddie Green
 Mr. Rhythm (RCA Victor, 1955)
With Milt Jackson
 Big Bags (Riverside, 1962)
With Harry James
Wild About Harry! (Capitol T/ST-874, 1957)
The New James (Capitol T/ST-1037, 1958)
Harry's Choice! (Capitol T/ST-1093, 1958)
Harry James and His New Swingin' Band (MGM E/SE-3778, 1959)
Harry James...Today! (MGM E/SE-3848, 1960)
The Spectacular Sound Of Harry James (MGM E/SE-3897, 1961)
The Solid Gold Trumpet Of Harry James (MGM E/SE-4058, 1962)
Harry James Twenty-fifth Anniversary Album (MGM E/SE-4214, 1964)
The King James Version (Sheffield Lab LAB 3, 1976)
Comin' From A Good Place (Sheffield Lab LAB 6, 1977)
With Quincy Jones
 The Great Wide World of Quincy Jones (Mercury, 1959)
With Sam Jones
 Down Home (Riverside, 1962)
With Mark Murphy
 Rah (Riverside, 1961)

With Charles McPherson

 Siku Ya Bibi (Day of the Lady) (Mainstream, 1972)
Today's Man (Mainstream, 1973)
With Joe Newman
 The Count's Men (Jazztone, 1955)
 Salute to Satch (RCA Victor, 1956)
 I Feel Like a Newman (Storyville, 1956)
 The Midgets (Vik, 1956)
 The Happy Cats (Coral, 1957)
 Joe Newman with Woodwinds (Roulette, 1958)
With Herb Pomeroy
 The Band and I (United Artists, 1958) with Irene Kral
With Rex Stewart and Cootie Williams
The Big Challenge (Jazztone, 1957)
With Sarah Vaughan and the Count Basie Orchestra
 Count Basie/Sarah Vaughan (Roulette, 1960)
With Dinah Washington
 In the Land of Hi-Fi (EmArcy, 1956)
With Eddie "Cleanhead" Vinson
Clean Head's Back in Town (Bethlehem, 1957)
With Charles Williams
 Stickball (Mainstream, 1972)

References 

1922 births
1999 deaths
American music arrangers
American jazz bandleaders
Swing bandleaders
Big band bandleaders
American jazz tenor saxophonists
American male saxophonists
Savoy Records artists
Mainstream Records artists
20th-century American saxophonists
American conductors (music)
American male conductors (music)
American expatriates in Denmark
20th-century American male musicians
American male jazz musicians